Engelsberg is a municipality in the district of Traunstein in Bavaria in Germany.

References

Traunstein (district)